Edgio, Inc., formerly Limelight Networks, Inc., is an American company that provides a content delivery network (CDN) service, used for delivery of digital media content and software. As of January 2023, the company's network has more than 300 points-of-presence and delivers with 250+ terabits per second of egress capacity across the globe.

Company history 

Edgio was founded in 2001 in Tempe, Arizona as Limelight Networks, a provider of content delivery network services. The company's Limelight Orchestrate Platform delivers Live and On-Demand video and online content to any connected device anywhere in the world.

In July 2006, the company closed a $130 million equity financing round led by Goldman Sachs Capital Partners. Limelight Networks later raised $240 million in an initial public offering, during June 2007, selling 16 million shares at $15. In April 2008, company founder Michael Gordon was recognized as a "Streaming Media All-Star" by StreamingMedia Magazine, for his contributions to the industry.

Over the years, Limelight has received several other awards for its services including, receiving Frost & Sullivan's prestigious award for Product Line Strategy in 2012. Forrester Research named Limelight a Strong Performer in The Forrester Wave™: Online Video Platforms, Q1 2013.

In October 2017, Limelight Networks was recognized on Streaming Media's List of "100 Companies that Matter Most in Online Video".

In January 2021, Limelight Networks and its board of directors announced that Bob Lyons has been named as the new president and CEO of Limelight Networks, Inc. and will join the company and the board of directors effective February 1, 2021.  Mr. Lyons was formerly CEO of Alert Logic.

In September 2021, Limelight Networks acquired Moov Corporation, which does business as Layer0. 

In June 2022, Limelight Networks acquired Edgecast from Yahoo! Inc. and rebranded itself to Edgio.

Technologies 

Edgio operates its own private network with more than 250+ terabits per second of global egress capacity.  The network consists of dense clusters of specially configured servers in more than 300 delivery locations (points-of-presence) which are interconnected through the company's global network and connected to more than 1000 Internet service provider (ISP) networks.  Edgio caches web content for its customers in multiple delivery locations around the world, serving it to users from the fastest location. A private fiber network backbone between its delivery locations allows cache-fill traffic and dynamic content to bypass the public internet and improve the delivery speed of content. This architecture is managed by intelligent proprietary software that increases the speed of delivery with fewer cache misses and can scale to handle surges in end-user demand.

The Edgio Platform 
The Edgio Platform is composed of services including content delivery, video packaging and content management, web acceleration, cloud security (including DDoS and WAF protection), and cloud storage.

Customers 
In August 2007, the company announced a technology and services agreement with Microsoft under which Limelight will help improve the performance, scalability, and reliability of Internet delivery of media content and online services, including video, music, games, software, and social media, across Microsoft's global Internet properties. In March 2008, the company was the infrastructure provider for the webcast of Oprah's "A New Earth" classroom series, featuring author Eckhart Tolle. The live event drew over 800,000 users. The server crashed during the event because of an error in the programming code; the crash was widely misreported as a failure of network infrastructure.

In May 2008, NBC announced that the company would be the content delivery network for the 2008 Summer Olympics webcast on NBCOlympics.com. Ultimately, the company delivered "more than 50 million unique visitors, resulting in 1.3 billion page views, 70 million video streams, and 600 million minutes of video watched" for NBCOlympics.com, using Microsoft Silverlight technology.

In June 2008, the company was the primary source of content delivery services for the online debut of Disney's Camp Rock. The 24-hour online event saw more than 863,000 total plays for the movie. In January 2009, the company delivered the inauguration of U.S. President Barack Obama to 2.5 million Internet viewers around the world, resulting in more than 9 million simultaneous multimedia streams overall flowing through the company's network. Later that year, in March, the company was the exclusive mobile content delivery provider for CBS' coverage of the 2009 NCAA tournament. Limelight Networks' technology was used to deliver coverage of the college basketball games to the Apple iPhone.

In 2012, Limelight helped deliver sporting events like the Wimbledon Tennis Championships, the Indian Cricket League, the European Championship and the RBS Six Nations’ rugby championships and helped several broadcasters deliver the 2012 Summer Games.

Described and Captured Media Program, a non profit educational organization uses Edgio to accelerate distribution by caching videos on servers as close to the user as possible.

In February 2017 Limelight was one of three content delivery networks to stream the NFL's Super Bowl.

Acquisitions 
 May 2009, the company acquired Kiptronic, Inc., a privately held provider of device-optimized content delivery solutions and dynamic advertising insertion. It exists today as the Orchestrate Video offering. 
 April 2010, the company acquired EyeWonder, Inc., a privately held provider of rich media advertising (or "interactive digital advertising") founded in 1999 for $110 million. As part of the purchase of EyeWonder, Limelight Networks, Inc. also purchased chors GmbH. Both of these businesses, which consisted of the EyeWonder business unit, were later sold to DG.
 August 2011 the company acquired Delve Networks, Inc., a privately held provider of cloud-based video publishing and analytics services. It exists today as the Orchestrate Video offering.
 May 2011, the company acquired AcceloWeb for $20 million. It exists today as the Orchestrate Performance offering.
 May 2011, the company acquired Clickability, a web content management system company, for $10 million. On December 23, 2013, Upland Software announced that they had acquired Clickability from Limelight.
 September 2021, the company acquired Moov Corporation, doing business as Layer0, a provider of sub-second web apps and APIs through an all-in-one Jamstack platform.
 June 2022, the company acquired Edgecast from Yahoo! Inc. for approximately $300 million.

Patent lawsuits
In June 2006, Limelight Networks was sued by Akamai Technologies and the Massachusetts Institute of Technology over alleged patent infringement. In April 2009, the District Court for the District of Massachusetts ruled that Limelight Networks did not infringe, overturning the February 2008 finding of a Boston jury. Similarly, in December 2007, Limelight Networks was sued by Level 3 Communications over alleged intellectual property and patent infringement. In January 2009, a jury ruled that Limelight Networks did not infringe. Akamai Technologies appealed part of the decision. On April 20, 2011, the United States Court of Appeals for the Federal Circuit granted the petition by Akamai Technologies for rehearing en banc its appeal in Akamai Technologies, Inc. v. Limelight Networks, Inc. The order vacated the earlier opinion of December 20, 2010. The order includes a request to file new briefs addressing this question: If separate entities each perform separate steps of a method claim, under what circumstances would that claim be directly infringed and to what extent would each of the parties be liable?

On August 31, 2012, the Court of Appeals for the Federal Circuit issued its opinion in the case. The Court of Appeals stated that the trial court determined that Limelight did not directly infringe on Akamai's patent. A slim majority in this three-way divided opinion also announced a revised legal theory of induced infringement, remanded the case to the trial court giving Akamai an opportunity for a new trial to attempt to prove induced infringement. On December 28, 2012, Limelight filed a petition asking the Supreme Court to review the decision of the Federal Circuit regarding the standard for induced infringement in cases where multiple parties may perform various steps of a patented claim. Akamai filed a cross petition asking the Court to also review the standard for direct infringement in those cases. On June 24, 2013, the Supreme Court asked the Solicitor General to weigh in on the petition for certiorari. In June 2014, the Supreme Court reached a unanimous decision rejecting Akamai's claim of "induced infringement".

On July 1, 2016, it was announced that the Massachusetts District Court entered the final judgment in the case, with Limelight paying $51M in total damages to Akamai (to be reflected in Limelight's 2016 Q2 earnings).

See also 
Content delivery network
Streaming media

References 

General references:

Limelight Networks - Customers
The Forrester Wave Vendor Summary, Q2 2006, June 9, 2006 - Limelight Networks Offers Low-Cost Rich Media Content Delivery
Macromedia Press Release, November 15, 2005 - Macromedia and Limelight Networks deliver Limelight MediaEdge Streaming for Macromedia Flash

2001 establishments in Arizona
2007 initial public offerings
American companies established in 2001
Companies based in Tempe, Arizona
Companies listed on the Nasdaq
Content delivery networks
Online mass media companies of the United States